The following is a list of events affecting Philippine television in 2020. Events listed include television show debuts, finales, cancellations, and channel launches, closures and rebrandings, as well as information about controversies and carriage disputes.

Events

January
 January 1
 Diva and E! have ceased its operations by NBCUniversal International Networks across Southeast Asia due to the review of the management's decision through changes in business direction.
 The Philippine feeds of Fox Networks Group-owned channels including Fox, Fox Life, Fox Movies and National Geographic (SD) were reverted to the main Southeast Asian feed with a local opt-out commercial feeds.
 January 4 - Jayson Nicolas, a former overseas worker in East Asia, emerged as the first BiyaHERO Grand Winner.
 January 7 - Sony Pictures Television sold four owned channels (Animax, AXN, GEM and ONE) to KC Global Media Entertainment, and later completed on May 11.
 January 10–12 - The Philippines hosted the 24th Asian Television Awards.

February
 February 2 - Juan Gapang of Bacolod City (Singing) and Kenyo Street Fam of Bulacan (Dancing) hailed as Your Moment Grand Champions.
 February 4 - Robert P. Galang became the new president and CEO of TV5 Network and Cignal TV, replacing Jane Basas.
 February 5 - ASAP celebrated its 25th anniversary on Philippine television.
 February 6 - ABS-CBN Films launched a new talent management arm, "Rise Artists Studio".
 February 10 - Solicitor General Jose Calida filed a quo warranto petition on the Supreme Court of the Philippines against ABS-CBN Corporation and its subsidiary ABS-CBN Convergence for seeking to revoke the ABS-CBN's broadcast franchise over alleged violations of the company.
 February 14 - Ryan Sy won  on It's Showtime's Piling Lucky.
 February 17 - TAP Digital Media Ventures Corporation rebranded three-owned channels: TAP Sports 1 to TAP Sports, TAP Sports 2 to TAP W and EDGEsport to TAP EDGE, as well as launched two-owned channels: Premier Football and Premier Tennis.
 February 25 - Radio Philippines Network celebrated its 60th anniversary of broadcasting via CNN Philippines.
 February 29
 After almost 3 years of broadcasting, Zee Sine has ceased its broadcast on pay TV by Essel Group due to programming redundancies, lack of advertising support and cost-cutting measures, as well as change in business direction.
 Sky Cable terminated Paramount Channel on its line-up due to the expiration of Sky's contract with the network.

March
 March 1
 GMA Network celebrated its 70th anniversary of broadcasting as a radio network.
 Intercontinental Broadcasting Corporation celebrated its 60th anniversary of broadcasting.
 March 8 - After one year of broadcast, 5 Plus rebranded as One Sports, coinciding with the start of the 2020 PBA season. It was the first MediaQuest Holdings free-to-air broadcast network and the first outside cable and satellite to use the "One" branding. In addition to transferring the name from cable to free-to-air, its cable and satellite counterpart has been also rebranded to One Sports+. Along with their sister network rebranding, One News and One PH updated a new updated logo, while 5 removed all ESPN–related references in the network's own sport division due to the rebranding of One Sports, with the website continued to run under the ESPN branding in partnership with The Walt Disney Company's GO Network.
 March 10–11 - During the COVID-19 pandemic that recently spread across the country, President Rodrigo Duterte's declaration as state of public health emergency and the World Health Organization's declaration as a pandemic, as well as local transmission of the coronavirus being present in the country, ABS-CBN and GMA Network announced the temporary suspension of their studio audience tapings for all of its shows, including the former's Magandang Buhay, It's Showtime, ASAP Natin 'To, Banana Sundae and the second season of I Can See Your Voice; and the latter's Mars Pa More, Eat Bulaga! (the first show suspending their live studio audience tapings on March 9), Wowowin (including its Saturday night primetime spin-off), Centerstage, Sarap, 'Di Ba?, The Boobay and Tekla Show and All-Out Sundays, as well as GMA News TV's Idol sa Kusina and Tonight with Arnold Clavio (which also been affected by the audience taping suspensions) as for the safety and well-being of the artists, crew and production teams. The aforementioned shows were continued to air in production without a studio audience as a precautionary measure.
 March 12 - The major sports leagues across the country announced a temporary suspension of games in an attempt to slow the spread of the coronavirus. The Philippine Basketball Association, the PBA Developmental League and the Philippine Super Liga announced an indefinite suspension of the league's activity, while the Maharlika Pilipinas Basketball League and the National Basketball League announced the suspension for the remainder of its playoffs. In addition, the National Collegiate Athletic Association and the University Athletic Association of the Philippines games were cancelled. The suspension of the five leagues affecting schedules of 5, One Sports, One Sports+, PBA Rush, S+A, Liga and Solar Sports.
 March 13 - The religious community has cancelled the majority of its Catholic masses and Christian worship services due to the pandemic. Religious programs were affected by the pandemic including ABS-CBN's The Healing Eucharist; PTV's Oras Ng Himala, Soldiers of Christ Healing on the Air and Jesus Miracle Crusade; 5's Misa Nazareno, Sambuhay TV Mass and The Word of God Network; CNN Philippines' TV Healing Mass for the Homebound; IBC's Family Appointment with El Shaddai and Feast TV; One Sports' Family TV Mass; S+A's Friends Again; Light TV's Jesus the Healer; SMNI's Sounds of Worship; and Life TV's Oras ng Katotohanan and The Lord's Day. The TV mass shows were continued to air without the churchgoers as a part of a precautionary measure.
 March 14 - ABS-CBN temporary suspended the productions of teleseryes and live entertainment shows including the episodes that were scheduled to complete effective March 15 as the COVID-19 pandemic continued to become a serious issue. Among of the primetime shows were affected including Pamilya Ko, FPJ's Ang Probinsyano, Make It with You and A Soldier's Heart, which were on hold from the schedule beginning March 16. Meanwhile, GMA Network also announced the suspension of productions on the network–produced teleseryes and live entertainment shows, as well as live entertainment shows co-produced by outside producers and blocktimers beginning March 15.
 March 16 - The Presidential Communications Operations Office began airing Public Briefing: #LagingHandaPH providing an official updates on the COVID-19 pandemic on PTV with simulcast on other media outlets through KBP-affiliated member stations.
 March 18
 To replace the broadcast of Umagang Kay Ganda and all ABS-CBN Regional morning programming (which were ordered to halt in order to support government efforts to fight against COVID-19), ABS-CBN revived its weekday morning linkup with DZMM TeleRadyo for the first time in years as a provisional programming, leading to the nationwide television simulcast of all DZMM-AM programs including Garantisadong Balita, Kabayan and Radyo Patrol Balita Alas Siyete.
 The infomercial industry has been affecting their shipping and deliveries, as well as delayed orderings due to the enhanced community quarantine brought by the COVID-19 pandemic. As an emergency measure, two companies announced their temporary suspension of their informercials telecast: TV Shop Philippines (on Intercontinental Broadcasting Corporation and RJ DigiTV beginning March 19, as well as temporary shut down of its standalone channel on BEAM TV starting March 30) and EZ Shop (on Intercontinental Broadcasting Corporation, BEAM TV, 5, One Sports and GMA News TV beginning March 19, but their standalone channel exclusively on Cignal continued its broadcast). The other companies were continued to air infomercials including O Shopping (on ABS-CBN, S+A, Jeepney TV, and its own standalone network on Sky Cable, Sky Direct and ABS-CBN TV Plus including TV Plus Go) and Shop TV (on ETC and its standalone channel on selected cable and satellite providers). 
 GMA News TV temporary shut down its operations in support of the enhanced community quarantine, whereas all of its staff were moving to GMA and the moved of Dobol B sa News TV to the mother station as Dobol B sa GMA effective March 19 with the simulcast of Melo del Prado sa Super Radyo DZBB, thus marked the first radio-television simulcast since the 1990s radio-TV program Kape at Balita. The Melo del Prado sa Super Radyo DZBB portion (which served as a lead-in to Unang Hirit) aired on March 19 and 20. On March 20, the mother network announced its decision to reverse the suspension for the remainder of its weekday and the entire weekend morning line-ups (with the exception of Yo-kai Watch–which temporary replaced by Sambuhay TV Mass beginning March 22 and Agripreneur, Kapwa Ko Mahal Ko and In Touch with Dr. Charles Stanley–all suspended from airing beginning March 21) due to the sister channel's resumption on March 21. Then on March 21, the English language newscast GMA Regional TV Weekend News was also moved to the mother network. Later on March 23, the two networks began simulcasting Super Balita sa Umaga Nationwide and Saksi sa Dobol B while Unang Hirit was on hiatus. The temporary, weekday-only joint network simulcast of Dobol B sa GMA/News TV ended on April 8 when Unang Hirit resumed on April 13 following the Holy Week break, while the temporary only broadcast of GMA Regional TV Weekend News ended on April 25, a week before its return to the sister network on May 2.
 In an unprecedented move following an employee from a company working in the Corporate World Center in Mandaluyong has diagnosed with the virus, CNN Philippines temporary shut down its broadcast for days to allowed for a disinfection works on its studios and control rooms. To compensated, selected programming was broadcast nationally through the channel's social media pages.
 As an emergency measure, ABS-CBN News Channel temporary simulcast DZMM TeleRadyo programming to local and international viewers but with its own commercials, cutting the feed for the channel's flagship, Top Story.
 March 19
 DZMM TeleRadyo temporary stopped the replay broadcast of ABS-CBN News and Current Affairs programming at 1p.m. from Mondays to Fridays (which began Monday as a result of the decision for the temporary halt broadcast of Good Vibes) and replaced by the news simulcast from ABS-CBN News Channel in another unprecedented decision, thus DZMM became the first radio station in many years since the end of English broadcast on DZRJ-AM in the 2010s to aired English-language news programming on the AM brand and by extension DZMM TeleRadyo became a pioneer in airing bilingual (Filipino and English) news programming in both cable and digital free-to-air television. The English broadcast aired from 1p.m. (after Headline Pilipinas) to 5a.m. on Tuesdays, Thursdays and Sundays, with ANC's relay of DZMM TeleRadyo programming on Mondays, Wednesdays, Fridays and Saturdays (Mondays, Wednesdays and Fridays starting at 6a.m. following Early Edition), with a break at 9a.m. for Market Edge during trading days in the Philippine Stock Exchange and 5p.m. for Top Story. With this decision, DZMM TeleRadyo aired The World Tonight for the first time on free-to-air digital television on Tuesday, Thursday and Sunday nights for the first time since 1999, while both were already taking a 6:30p.m. break for the live simulcast of TV Patrol (weekdays only).
 CNN Philippines adopted the video technology services of TVU Networks for local broadcast.
 March 20
 One News Now (which also made its first broadcast on 5) became the first aired English-language news broadcast since the end of delayed broadcast of The Big Story. It also marked the first primetime English-language newscast since 2007-08's Sentro to broadcast. Meanwhile, the network's flagship newscast, Aksyon (in its noontime and primetime editions) has officially retired after almost a decade, while the network's simulcast of One Balita (from One PH) and Morning Calls (from Radyo 5 92.3 News FM and One PH) were on hold in support of the government efforts to fight against COVID-19. The primetime portion was ended on May 6, when the network temporary revived the One PH program One Balita Pilipinas on May 7, while the noontime portion ended on May 29, when One Balita resumed on June 1.
 DZMM TeleRadyo made history with the use of video technology from Zoom Video Communications for the Friday night broadcast of Labor of Love, and Saturday morning to afternoon broadcast of Tandem: Lima at Logan, Magpayo Nga Kayo, Konsyumer ATBP., Usapang Kalye, Good Job and Omaga-Diaz Report simulcast on ANC, making it a pioneer (and third overall) among the country's news channels.
 BEAM TV temporary off the air due to the enhanced community quarantine amid the COVID-19 pandemic.
 March 21
 GMA News TV resumed it broadcast with an expanded Dobol B sa News TV broadcast as a provisional programming.
 Pop Life TV temporary off the air due to the enhanced community quarantine amid the COVID-19 pandemic.
 March 22
 As part of the network's 70th anniversary, GMA launched the online-only Buong Puso Para sa Pilipino No-Contract Show, a weekly virtual entertainment-show-cum-fan-meet-up with network talents to raise funds for relief efforts for people affected by the enhanced community quarantine in Luzon and all the medical workers, as well as to give back to its loyal viewers and listeners in radio and television for seven decades.
 DZMM TeleRadyo moved to full 24/7 provisionally broadcast on digital free-to-air and cable, with ANC programming being aired on Sunday late nights until 4:30a.m. on Mondays.
 Sambuhay TV Mass provisionally moved to GMA from 5 with a 6:00a.m. broadcast slot on Sundays, became the channel's first Catholic TV Mass broadcast since the Family TV Mass in 2014–15. To replace the former program, 5 debuted the television delayed broadcast of Misa sa Veritas (via Radio Veritas) on Sunday late afternoon.
 March 23
 CNN Philippines resumed its operations with the special coverage of the special session of both chambers of Congress as the highlight.
 As an emergency measure, Net 25 extended (at the cost of certain programs) the airing times of Agila Balita, Agila Probinsya, the midday Agila Pilipinas and the primetime Mata ng Agila, as well as the Filipino and English-language editions of Eagle News International.
 Eat Bulaga! began including footage from the program's first 40 years in television (including the past 24 seasons on GMA) on its provisional rerun episodes. The rerun episodes ended on June 6, when the show plans to resume its audience-free live episodes on June 8.
 March 25
 ABS-CBN Channel 2 programming (due to the decision to temporary stop the selected TV Patrol regional broadcast as a result of government efforts to fight against COVID-19 countrywide) began airing the selected television stations of the Regional Network Group (Channel 46 Pampanga, Channel 7 Palawan and Channel 4 Davao) in full via satellite as a provisional measure, with their regional reporters temporarily responsible to the national headquarters in Quezon City through local news bureau chiefs, while all local advertising remained. This include Magandang Buhay and It's Showtime (which resumed broadcast at the time) were live nationwide from the homes of the presenters through the Zoom platform, a first in Philippine television history. Both the status of Palawan and Davao stations ended on April 20, when said broadcast in these markets resumed on the said date.
 While ABS-CBN Channel 7 Palawan local programming took a pause, TV Patrol Palawan became the first-historic regional TV Patrol broadcast to aired live via the channel's social media sites from Mondays to Fridays.
 March 26 - ABS-CBN Channel 11 Naga provisionally became a semi-satellite of Channel 2 Metro Manila as TV Patrol Bicol temporary stopped broadcast while retaining local advertisement slots for its stations over Bicol Region. The status ended on March 30, when said broadcast resumed airing.
 March 27 - A public demand forced ABS-CBN to provisionally reduced the Saturday KB Family Weekend block to just one movie instead of the usual two as it dedicated the first slot (8:30a.m. to 10a.m., following Dok Ricky, Pedia) for its award-winning Educational Television produced programming (Bayani, Hiraya Manawari and Sine'skwela) courtesy of the cable and digital free-to-air channel, Knowledge Channel to serve the millions of pre-school and elementary students whose studies as a result of the pandemic and the quarantines imposed by many local governments (as well as the Luzon-wide enhanced community quarantine) have been interrupted, while also aiming to introduced the channel and its valuable work to millions of viewers nationwide with the provisional educational programming began on March 28. Later on, both Bayani and Hiraya Manawari aired on Sundays as well as lead-in to MathDali at 9:15a.m. beginning April 12.
 March 30 - One Sports temporary suspended its broadcast due to limitations brought by the Enhanced Community Quarantine in Luzon, with its sister networks 5, One Sports+ and PBA Rush took over some of its archived programming, except for other programs such as Talking Heads (which moved to BEAM TV beginning May 16).

April
 April 1
 ABS-CBN's TV Patrol became the fourth national newscast to incorporate simultaneous sign language interpretation for the deaf and hard of hearing on its broadcast in addition to closed captioning, following 5's lead years before with its News5 newscasts. Previously, sign language interpretation has been available in the regional TV Patrol editions in Palawan and Central Visayas.
 After almost 15 years of broadcasting, Jack TV has ceased its commercial broadcast on pay TV by Solar Entertainment Corporation due to programming redundancies, lack of advertising support and cross-cutting measures as well as change in business direction during the COVID-19 pandemic in the Philippines. Meanwhile, it continued as a digital web portal on their official online media platforms, while most of the programming being planned to migrate in either ETC or Solar Sports.
 Front Row Channel (which is the Philippine version of a global TV network of the same name) was officially launched by the joint venture between Solar Entertainment Corporation and Jungo TV, which is distributed by GMA Network, as the 24-hour music channel that specialized in broadcast of live concerts with featured performances from the world's top musical acts. While it has been initially launched in other cable providers, the channel hasn't been placed in the lineups of major cable systems and satellite providers.
 Kuwentuhang Lokal and Pasada 630 became the first DZMM TeleRadyo programs to fully aired with productions using the Zoom platform.
 DZMM Radyo Patrol 630 and DZMM TeleRadyo switched to simultaneous telecast with the English-language ABS-CBN News Channel starting at 10:00p.m. as DZMM temporarily suspended its regular programming after asking all concerned on-duty personnel to go on self-quarantine for 14 days following their exposure to two "persons under investigation", while to those who have not been exposed shall work from home with its studio and facilities have been vacated and immediately disinfected. With this move, DZMM and DZMM TeleRadyo, as well as the regional AM radio stations DYAP and DXAB, became an English-only broadcast (for the first time in history after many years) as a provisional measure. From 5:30p.m. to 10p.m., the channel aired the best of ABS-CBN News and Current Affairs programming in their place with a 6:30p.m. break for TV Patrol.
 After almost two years, DisneyLife ceased its operations by The Walt Disney Company in the Philippines, due to the upcoming launch of their own streaming service in the country. The service was originally launched as an all-in-one streaming service in 2018 with Globe Telecom as a partner provider, replacing the TV streaming apps: "Watch Disney Channel", "Watch Disney Junior" and "Watch Disney XD" (which all launched as part of Globe Telecom's partnership in 2015 where it later replaced the "Watch" name to the "App" name on all three services in 2016) for the Philippines.
 After past three years, Fox+ ceased its operations by Fox Networks Group in the Philippines due to cross-cutting measures as well as change in business direction. The ad-free subscription service was originally launched locally in 2017 as a merger of the company's three streaming services: "Fox Play", "Fox Movies Play" and "Fox Sports Play" for the Philippines, with PLDT, Inc. alongside its sister companies Smart Communications and Cignal TV as a founding provider partners and later with Globe Telecom as an additional provider partner in 2018. With the service was eventually acquired by The Walt Disney Company as a sister streamer to DisneyLife in 2019, the PLDT Group announced that would back out as a provider partner in August in the same year, leaving Globe as the only provider partner for the Philippines until its closure. Following the closure, the subscribers have encourage to continue watching these shows, movies, documentaries and live sporting events on the company's linear TV networks after on that date.
 April 2
 With the switch to the English broadcast on ANC as a result of the decision to suspend DZMM's programs, DYAB TeleRadyo provisionally introduced English-language broadcast via ANC in select hours, in combination with TV Patrol and the Cebuano-language programming aired on the channel. Also, the ANC simulcast provisionally began airing on both ABS-CBN (from 5a.m. to 8a.m.) and S+A (from 8a.m. to 10a.m.), thus bringing the special editions of Early Edition and Headstart as well as Market Edge (the two programs were only aired on S+A via simulcast). The broadcast were the first English news broadcast on both channels after many years.
 Following TV Patrol's lead the previous night, ANC's Dateline Philippines added the simultaneous sign language interpretation for the deaf and hard of hearing viewers who watch the channel, thus marked the first ANC telecast to utilize it.
 April 3 - DZMM TeleRadyo resumed its transmissions, with almost all programming and field reports aired via the Zoom platform, but with ANC commercials instead of the channel's commercials. ANC graphics for news stories, as well as for reporter and presenter introductions, would debuted beginning with the Headline Pilipinas broadcast, as well as the Saturday edition on April 4.
 April 5–8 - In the wake of the cancellation of this year's APT Entertainment Holy Week Drama Special which suppose to aired via GMA on April 11 due to the COVID-19 pandemic, 5 re-aired the previous Lenten Drama Specials produced by APT, including Milagroso from 2006 and May Milagroso Pa Nga Ba? from 2002 (retitled May Milagroso Pa Nga Ba? (Part 1)-Ang Hiling, May Milagroso Pa Nga Ba? (Part 2)-Sister Choleng and May Milagroso Pa Nga Ba? (Part 3)-Awit ni Miling for its re-airing).
 April 6
 TV Patrol officially made history with the first news reports aired using the Zoom platform.
 ABS-CBN and Star Cinema (through Star Creatives) launched an online entertainment program, Rise and Shine, aired on Facebook midday on Mondays, Wednesdays and Fridays (with a same day encore on YouTube) with DJ Jai Ho (the presenter of the Sunday Showbiz Pa More! on Jeepney TV) hosted the program.
 Inquirer 990 Television resumed its broadcast after a three-week break.
 April 9–11 - By virtue of a partnership between the Church of Jesus Christ of Latter-day Saints in the Philippines, GMA Network and ABS-CBN Corporation (given the effects of the enhanced community quarantine in Luzon and many other provinces) aired the 190th General Conference of the Church of Jesus Christ of Latter-Day Saints from the Conference Center in Temple Square, Salt Lake City, Utah, USA and being broadcast countrywide through both free-to-air and cable via GMA and DZMM TeleRadyo with simulcast on ABS-CBN News Channel (for April 9 and 11 only) during the Easter Triduum period, marked the first time via satellite delay (the Music and the Spoken Word conference edition was aired via GMA on April 11).
 April 10
 The 2020 edition of SVD-Mission Communications Foundation's Seven Last Words from the Diocesan Shrine and Parish of Jesus, the Divine Word at Christ the King Mission Seminary in Quezon City was cancelled due to the COVID-19 pandemic, and it was originally televised live on both ABS-CBN and DZMM TeleRadyo with a delay on Jeepney TV. In lieu of the special, ABS-CBN aired The Young Messiah movie and the network–produce Ang Pitong Huling Salita special in its place.
 For the first time in its 27-year history on television, The Dominican Fathers of the Philippines' Siete Palabras has switched to the pre-recorded format this year, which was originally to aired live from the Sto. Domingo Church in Quezon City but it was scrapped due to the COVID-19 pandemic. The special was televised for the 12th year by GMA Network (with selected GMA Regional TV stations in Visayas and Mindanao pre-empting the national special with the local versions of the said special), and the simulcast on Radyo Veritas in Manila and other Catholic Media Network radio stations nationwide.
 April 12 - ABS-CBN provisionally moved two Nickelodeon programs: SpongeBob SquarePants and The Loud House, to 7:30a.m. and 7:50a.m. on Sunday (following Swak na Swak) as a result of an expansion to the network's educational television programming supplied by the cable and digital free-to-air channel, Knowledge Channel beginning at 8:15a.m.
 April 13
 The commercial feeds of both ANC and DZMM TeleRadyo on Mondays, Wednesdays, Fridays and Saturdays were separated after days of using a singular commercial feed. In addition, DZMM (and DZMM TeleRadyo) resumed the use of its radio studios following disinfection measures, with SRO: Suhestyon, Reaksyon at Opinion as the first broadcast to aired.
 GMA News TV resumed its evening broadcast of its own public affairs and documentary programming and the BBC Natural History Unit's Planet Earth II, while retaining the provisional Dobol B sa News TV afternoon broadcast and 24 Oras simulcast. Later on April 18, five lifestyle programs were also resumed.
 April 20
 After 4 weeks, the timesharing of programming between both DZMM TeleRadyo and ANC ended, with ANC resumed its separate programming on Mondays and DZMM slowly resumed its broadcast from the radio studios.
 GMA Network's 24 Oras became the fifth national newscast to incorporate simultaneous sign language interpretation for the deaf and hard of hearing in its broadcast. In addition, its online livestream on YouTube converted its airing in full high definition, making it the third in the country.
 April 21 - Infomercial company O Shopping temporary suspended its broadcast on ABS-CBN due to the enhanced community quarantine during the COVID-19 pandemic in the Philippines, thus became the third infomercial company to suspend their broadcast, following TV Shop Philippines and EZ Shop (both of which previously announced their broadcast suspensions in the previous month). However, the broadcast continued to air on S+A, Jeepney TV and its own standalone network on Sky Cable, Sky Direct and ABS-CBN TV Plus (including TV Plus Go). With that, ABS-CBN reverted to signing off at midnight, with signing-on before the broadcast of Kapamilya Daily Mass (and effective May 4, the replay broadcast of ABS-CBN News and Current Affairs programming) on Mondays to Fridays at 4:20a.m. (with Jesuit Communications Foundation produced show Kape't Pandesal preceding it), Saturdays at 5:25a.m. and before The Healing Eucharist on Sundays at 5:55a.m.
 April 23 - Net 25, the television network of Iglesia ni Cristo-affiliated company Eagle Broadcasting Corporation, celebrated its 20th anniversary of broadcasting.
 April 25–26 - With the termination of the timesharing policies of both DZMM TeleRadyo and ANC, both stations resumed its separate weekend programming schedules. Meanwhile on DZMM TeleRadyo, music-related programs (Yesterday and Remember When), news-related shows (Sagot Ko 'Yan! and Red Alert) and the public affairs program (Tulong Ko, Pasa Mo) resumed its broadcast on April 26 after a month long hiatus.
 April 29 - For the first time in weeks, ABS-CBN readjusted its mid-morning and midday programming with a new provisional expansion of Kapamilya Blockbusters with two movies starting at 10a.m. and 11:50a.m. respectively, resulting to It's Showtime being pushed back to 1:30p.m. but with a reduced one-hour run for the first time in its 11-year run of the show, and Love in Sadness also moved following Magandang Buhay at 9:30a.m. as lead-in to the expanded block. The said expansion followed the success of the expanded Sunday edition of KB Family Weekend.
 April 30 - After past five years, HOOQ ceased its operations by Singtel, Sony Pictures and Warner Bros. across all countries, including the Philippines, after the provider filed for liquidation on March 27. Meanwhile, Korean-based company Coupang announced the purchase of HOOQ's assets on July 10.

May
 May 1 - ABS-CBN announced that the simulcast of Kabayan and Radyo Patrol Balita Alas Siyete via DZMM TeleRadyo ended its airing nationwide to give way for the return of Umagang Kay Ganda and all the ABS-CBN Regional Network Group morning programs in regional areas (except for Palawan and Southern Tagalog) beginning May 4.
 May 2 - Infomercial company EZ Shop resumed its broadcast on Intercontinental Broadcasting Corporation after two months of suspension due to the enhanced community quarantine during the COVID-19 pandemic in the Philippines, thus became the first company to partly resumed its broadcast. Meanwhile, the company remained suspend its broadcast on BEAM TV, 5, One Sports and GMA News TV.
 May 5 - Most of ABS-CBN's free TV and radio broadcasting operations from ABS-CBN Corporation including ABS-CBN Channel 2, MOR 101.9, DZMM Radyo Patrol 630 and its television counterpart (temporarily renamed as TeleRadyo due to DZMM's sign off at 8:20p.m. and returned on May 8 in digital free-to-air and cable providers, as well as in online platforms), S+A, its regional stations, the free-to-air operations of Jeepney TV, Knowledge Channel, Myx and O Shopping, Asianovela Channel, and Movie Central signed off the air at 7:52p.m. due to the cease-and-desist order of the National Telecommunications Commission to temporary stop the broadcast operations of ABS-CBN Corporation because of the expiration of its franchise granted on March 30, 1995. Meanwhile, the live channel streaming broadcast of ABS-CBN and DZMM TeleRadyo were unavailable via iWant on the same day with O Shopping and ABS-CBN News Channel took over as temporary replacement of the streaming channels. And finally, Creative Programs owned pay TV channels (Cinema One, Liga, Metro Channel, Myx and Jeepney TV), ABS-CBN News Channel, Cine Mo!, Knowledge Channel, O Shopping and Yey! remain unaffected in some digital terrestrial television and direct-to-home providers, including their standalone pay-per-view channel Kapamilya Box Office, which is also available for ABS-CBN TV Plus, Sky Cable and Sky Direct subscribers.
 May 6 - A day after the final broadcast on free-to-air, ABS-CBN formally announced that due to demand from the overseas audiences on The Filipino Channel, TV Patrol has resumed its broadcast on the said channel effective May 7 after a two-day break live in all TFC platforms (including online, cable and satellite feeds), thus continuing a tradition of broadcasting to Filipinos abroad since 1989. In addition, the live broadcast of the newscast through online platforms and ABS-CBN News Channel would also continued beginning on the same day, with the channel provisionally shouldering the program's airing and production.
 May 7 - Aside from the announcement on the return of TeleRadyo, ABS-CBN also announced that all TV Patrol regional editions has resumed its broadcast via Facebook Live through their respective pages effective May 8.
 May 8 - Knowledge Channel temporary shut down its free-to-air broadcast on ABS-CBN TV Plus due to the cease-and-desist order of the NTC to close down its broadcasting operations of ABS-CBN. Meanwhile, the channel continued its broadcast on cable providers.
 May 12 - In yet another ABS-CBN announcement, all ABS-CBN Regional Network Group morning programming has resumed airing but for online-only to regional viewers starting at 7a.m. on May 13 through Facebook Live.
 May 14 - ABS-CBN launched a new online service, Online Kapamilya Shows (OKS), as the digital-only content can be accessed.
 May 15 - GagaOOLala, a streaming service owned by Portico Media Co., Ltd., was expanded to all territories except China and North Korea, including the Philippines.
 May 16
 BEAM TV resumed its operation of regular programming.
 Aside from the resumption of BEAM TV's broadcast, infomercial company EZ Shop announced the resumption of its broadcast on the said channel starting on the same day, a few weeks after the company resumed its telecast via Intercontinental Broadcasting Corporation on May 2. Meanwhile, other networks such as 5, One Sports and GMA News TV remained suspend the telecast of the said company.
 TV Shop Philippines announced the resumption of its broadcast on RJ DigiTV only after a two-month break due to the enhanced community quarantine during the COVID-19 pandemic in the Philippines, thus became the second company to partly resumed its broadcast.
 May 22 - One PH, a Filipino-language news and talk channel from Cignal, started its test broadcast on digital terrestrial television as a subchannel of 5 (via DWET-TV).
 May 26–July 9 - the 18th Congress of the Philippines, particularly on the House of Representatives through the Joint Committees on Legislative Franchises, Good Government and Public Accountability, tackled the franchise applications of ABS-CBN for the renewal of its existing franchise, which was expired on May 4.

June
 June 1 - Due to insisted public demand, Asianovela Channel and Jeepney TV restarted its free-to-air broadcast on ABS-CBN TV Plus while still on free trial as the two channels were assigned as temporary replacement served for ABS-CBN and S+A.
 June 4 - Following the announcement by the Inter-Agency Task Force for the Management of Emerging Infectious Diseases to allow the mass gatherings on churches in General Community Quarantine and Modified General Community Quarantine areas nationwide as well as the statement of ABS-CBN and The Healing Eucharist official Facebook page to temporary stop the admission of studio audience on its Sunday broadcast (live and recorded telecast on Jeepney TV and TeleRadyo) due to the COVID-19 outbreak, The Healing Eucharist - Sunday TV Mass production team announced the temporary suspension of the live audiences admission within four consecutive Sundays effective June 7 to 28.
 June 5 - Liza Soberano's manager Ogie Diaz took an address to the queries of the fans that Make It with You has been cancelled, thus not being included in the lineup of ABS-CBN shows that scheduled to air on the newly announced pay TV channel.
 June 7 - Some ABS-CBN programs (mostly from ABS-CBN News and Current Affairs such as Kuha Mo!, Mission Possible, S.O.C.O.: Scene of the Crime Operatives and Umagang Kay Ganda) continued to deliver new and fresh episodes through online.
 June 12 - During the special coverage of the 122nd Independence Day celebration on People's Television Network, the infographic made a mistake in regarding the picture of the first president Emilio Aguinaldo and the mention of the Katipunan supreme leader Andres Bonifacio. The network later apologized for the error during the coverage and it was later revised with the correct picture of Andres Bonifacio and the mention of Emilio Aguinaldo on the network's social media pages. According to the statement, the error causing the management of the said network that they needed skills development and necessary training to be initiated.
 June 13
 Following the Independence Day and in celebration of 74 years since its corporate formation, ABS-CBN began its phased return to full broadcasting on launching a cable and satellite-only channel, Kapamilya Channel (which is also the 2nd incarnation of the same name after it used as an international channel in 2007 replacing Pinoy Central TV before rebranding to BRO in 2011), thus officially resumed the broadcast of entertainment, educational, news and current affairs programming from ABS-CBN which was stopped due to the shutdown of its free-to-air television amid the legislative franchise lapsed. This was announced through TV Patrol on its June 4 broadcast, with its official launch video also debuted on the same program a day later.
 As part of a longer morning educational television block launch, Knowledge Channel and some of ABS-CBN's legendary award-winning educational programs, officially began airing via Kapamilya Channel on weekends starting today and on June 14 with its purpose to help the educational needs of millions of Filipino children and youth from both public and private educational institutions in the pre-school and elementary levels during the current COVID-19 pandemic.
 ABS-CBN's RGE Drama Unit announced the cancellation of Pamilya Ko with no reason was given, a week after the cancellation of Make It With You due to the health concerns of its lead actress Liza Soberano, as well as the enhanced community quarantine in Luzon and the ABS-CBN franchise renewal controversy.
 June 14
 GMA Network, Inc. celebrated its 70th anniversary of corporate formation.
 Movie Central resumed its partial broadcast as a programming block via Kapamilya Channel after a month of halt broadcast due to the lapsed of its broadcast franchise.
 June 15
 Cignal TV launched a brand new 24/7 movie and drama channel on satellite television, One Screen, which featured films from local features, Tagalized Hollywood films and European movies (in its original language) supplied by Cinemaworld, as well as dramas from North America and local content from GMA Network and the satellite service's corporate siblings 5 and Cignal Entertainment.
 One Sports resumed its operation of regular programming.
 June 19 - 5 celebrated its 60th anniversary of broadcasting.
 June 22 - After a year of being off-air, ZOE Broadcasting Network reactivated its VHF channel 11 while at the same time opened its assigned DTT channel 20. Since then, both were under test broadcast but still open for blocktime or channel lease offers.
 June 24 - Tencent acquired Malaysian streaming service, iflix.
 June 26 - GMA Network formally launched its digital terrestrial television brand, GMA Affordabox.
 June 27 - ABS-CBN's Kapamilya Tickets (KTX) extended its service from the online ticketing portal of ABS-CBN live shows to a digital portal including virtual venue and streaming platform (dubbed as Key To Experiences) that can host simultaneous events, such as from concerts and movie premieres to trade shows, for promising an exclusive experience for organizers and participants.
 June 29 - As part of its 70th anniversary festivities, GMA Network formally launched its brand new Asianovela channel on digital terrestrial television, Heart of Asia.
 June 30 - Most of ABS-CBN's digital broadcasting operations from ABS-CBN Convergence using the digital terrestrial television provider ABS-CBN TV Plus, alongside a blocktime agreement with AMCARA Broadcasting Network including its use of digital frequency on Channel 43 carrying Asianovela Channel, Yey!, Kapamilya Box Office, and the free-to-air operations of Jeepney TV, Cine Mo! and TeleRadyo airing in Metro Manila and nearby provinces, as well as the operations of Sky Cable Corporation on its usage of their direct to home satellite service Sky Direct signed off the air at 8:30p.m. due to the alias cease-and-desist order of the National Telecommunications Commission to temporary stop the broadcast operations of ABS-CBN TV Plus and Sky Direct because of the expiration of its franchise granted on March 30, 1995. Meanwhile, ABS-CBN News Channel, Kapamilya Channel, Cine Mo!, TeleRadyo, O Shopping, Knowledge Channel and Creative Programs owned pay TV channels (Cinema One, Liga, Metro Channel, Myx and Jeepney TV) remain unaffected on Sky Cable and some direct-to-home providers in nearby areas. While in ABS-CBN TV Plus, the digital broadcast of other networks also remain unaffected and the operations continue outside Metro Manila.

July
 July 1 - A day after the two alias cease-and-desist order of the National Telecommunications Commission to temporary stop the broadcast operations of ABS-CBN TV Plus and Sky Direct, ABS-CBN announced that Asianovela Channel, Yey!, Kapamilya Box Office, and the free-to-air operations of Jeepney TV, Cine Mo! and TeleRadyo airing on ABS-CBN TV Plus outside Metro Manila were temporary stopped its digital broadcasting and signed off the air at 6:00p.m. Meanwhile, Cine Mo!, TeleRadyo and Jeepney TV remain unaffected on Sky Cable and some direct-to-home providers in nearby areas. While in ABS-CBN TV Plus, the digital broadcast of other networks also remain unaffected and the operations still continue.
 July 7
 After almost eight years of broadcasting, Fox Filipino has ceased its broadcast by Fox Networks Group (a subsidiary of Disney International Operations owend by The Walt Disney Company) due to programming redundancies, lack of advertising support and cross-cutting measures. Meanwhile, GMA Network (the network's content partner since its 2012 launch) said that they encouraged the viewers to continue to watch the older shows of the network that was previously aired on Fox Filipino on the network's partner streaming services such as iflix and Amazon Prime Video under the GMA On Demand banner, the network's new digital network Heart of Asia, as well as the new cable and satellite network One Screen.
 CNN Philippines temporary shut down its broadcast again and limit its broadcast of select programs through online to allow the disinfection of its studios in Corporate World Center in Mandaluyong, where one of its network staff tested positive with the virus.
 July 10 - After 12 hearings which began on May 26, the House of Representatives, particularly on the Committee on Legislative Franchises, unofficially voted 70–11–2–1 (rejected–favored–rescued–abstained) to deny the franchise application of ABS-CBN at 3:09p.m. Following that, ABS-CBN Corporation (which is a media conglomerate or mainstream media) announced that would instead focus on limited businesses that does not require a legislative franchise including digital channels, cable, international licensing and distribution, and production of content for various streaming services.
 July 13 - ABS-CBN's subsidiary Creative Programs, Inc., launched For Your Entertainment (FYE) Channel, exclusively on a Filipino-made social networking service, Kumu.
 July 19 - People's Television Network announced a one-day halt of broadcast running for 24 hours to give way for the disinfection of its main studios and offices in Visayas Avene, Quezon City, following a network employee has been tested positive with the virus.
 July 27 - Cignal TV and its sister company, Smart Communications announced a multi-year deal with the National Basketball Association for the league's official broadcast rights in the Philippines, replacing Solar Entertainment Corporation. The games during the 2019–20 season would aired on free-to-air networks 5 and One Sports (replacing CNN Philippines as a temporary exclusive free-to-air broadcaster, which eventually dropped in March because of the COVID-19 pandemic in the United States and in Canada, as well as the 4-month suspension of the league's games). Meanwhile, Smart postpaid and prepaid subscribers can avail the live streaming through its service platform. The deal was started on the same day the NBA's restart of the current season began. This marked the first time the NBA broadcast on 5 since the then-ABC 5 last aired the NBA games (in partnership with Solar) from 2007 to 2008.
 July 31 - In coinciding with the NBA's restart of the current season, Cignal TV launched a brand new 24/7 basketball channel on satellite television, NBA TV Philippines (which is the Philippine version of an American channel of the same name), replacing NBA Premium TV (which was formerly owned by the NBA's former Philippine broadcaster, Solar Entertainment Corporation) after ten months of absence thus exclusively available on the satellite provider, though Cignal plans to offer the channel for syndication to other cable operators.

August
 August 1
 ABS-CBN Corporation launched a livestreaming exclusive and recapping episodes for old, new and well-loved shows of ABS-CBN on their digital and online platforms such as Facebook and YouTube, Kapamilya Online Live.
 People's Television Network announced that its news programming including their hourly updates remained in light of the network's reduced manpower policies beginning August 3 up to September 6 (formerly on August 10), which affect all programming schedules resulting in a reduction of live programming hours. As a result, PTV News and the certain editions of PTV Balita Ngayon converted to remote production. The planned return of the Philippine Lotto Draw broadcast starting August 7 (formerly on August 4) would go on as planned in phrases.
 August 2
 In response to a live webinar demanding a return to ECQ restrictions by the representatives of the country's medical profession a day before, Kapamilya Channel reshuffled its Sunday programming with the Sunday KB Family Weekend block expanded to two movies, pushing ASAP Natin 'To to a new timeslot at 12:30p.m.
 As part of the celebrations on its 70th anniversary, GMA Network launched a new online service, GMA Entertainment Shows (GETS) Online, which can accessed and binge-watch of both the network's past archive and current programs as well as digital-only contents on their internet platforms.
 Imbestigador celebrated its 20th anniversary on Philippine television.
 August 11
 The Department of Education launched DepEd TV, an educational programming service block featuring lessons for students under the basic level of formal education system on TV and radio as part of their distance learning while face–to–face learning was prohibited due to COVID-19 pandemic. It started the test broadcast run of the programs via IBC and digital-only Channel 30 until August 21 except weekends. DepEd also plans to broadcast using three television stations each for elementary, junior high school, and both senior high school and Alternative Learning System. During its first run, DepEd TV was criticized for the incorrect grammar in Grade 8 English subject. But on August 14, the agency announced the postponement on the opening of regular classes in public schools to October 5, thus placing its test run ended on the same day. On September 21–25, DepEd TV conducted a final test broadcast via broadcast networks (IBC and other partnered channels), direct-to-home satellite providers (Cignal and G Sat), and various cable providers (particularly the members of the Philippine Cable Television Association).
 Solar Learning was launched as the all-day free-to-air digital terrestrial channel specialized for the online social learning and education classes owned by Solar Entertainment Corporation in partnership with the Department of Education.
 August 12 - Following the successful launch of Kapamilya Online Live, ABS-CBN's Star Music relaunched a digital online channel for children's learning by using music exclusively on their digital and online platforms including Facebook, Spotify and YouTube, TuTuBee (formerly called Star Music Kids).
 August 14
 ABS-CBN's Knowledge Channel launched "School at Home: Ang Saya Matuto ng Bago", a campaign program aligned with the Most Essential Learning Competencies in the DepEd's Basic Education Learning Continuity Plan which targeted students to learn at home during the COVID-19 pandemic.
 Vice Ganda launched its own digital network powered by Viva Digital, The Vice Ganda Network. It was originally launched on July 24, but due to the technical issues of the said network, it was postponed and moved to its current date.
 August 15 - MediaQuest Holdings, through TV5 Network, Inc. announced The 5 Network or simply 5 would reverted to its former name, TV5, with brand new entertainment programs in collaboration with its sister company, Cignal TV (under Cignal Entertainment), through blocktime agreements co-produced with other content providers such as Archangel Media, Inc., Brightlight Productions and Viva Television, among others. Originally, the plan was to rebranding it into One TV on April 13 (first) and July 20 (second) respectively, but because of the community quarantines in the Philippines amid the COVID-19 pandemic, it was silently decided to not carry on with its promotions through its digital and online platforms have been removed. There's no official word yet from the company if the rebrand would continue or not in the near future whereas some reports told that TV5 has cancelled its plans to rebrand.
 August 16 - Heart Salvador (coached by Bamboo Mañalac), Cydel Gabutero (coached by Lea Salonga), Isang Manlapaz (coached by apl.de.ap) and Kendra Aguirre (coached by Sarah Geronimo), all won the second season of The Voice Teens for the first time in The Voice of the Philippines history.
 August 25 - News5 announced that all of their radio and television programming were being converted to remote production as a result of a massive disinfection of the TV5 Media Center following a network employee has been tested positive with the virus. This followed a prior shutdown of news operations on TV5, One PH and One News from August 21 to 23, which had been also announced.
 August 27 - Following the acquisition of iflix on June 24, Tencent announced the collaboration of the said service with its own streaming service (Tencent Video or WeTV) under the unified referral as "WeTV iflix". However, both platforms were still operate autonomously with its own shared strategies.
 August 28 - After almost 32 years, ABS-CBN Regional ceased its operations with 12 TV Patrol–themed newscasts, 10 news bulletins and 10 morning shows ended their broadcast following the denial of its legislative franchise on July 10.
 August 30 - YouTube launched "Super Stream" in the Philippines featuring limited free access of quality binge-watch local TV, movie and sports contents in collaboration with media partners.
 August 31 - ABS-CBN Corporation announced on July 15 that it ceased the operations of some of its businesses and implemented a retrenchment program covering the company and its subsidiaries, following the non-renewal of its congressional franchise on July 10.

September
 September 1
 ABS-CBN's streaming media services iWant and TFC Online were merged into one over-the-top content platform, iWantTFC, and began its soft launched on the same date exclusively on the web browser and mobile application, as well as be accessible in the Philippines and worldwide. In addition, Sky On Demand was also merged with iWantTFC and The Filipino Channel (TFC) would also available on US-based service, Xfinity in HD.
 TeleRadyo Cebu (formerly DYAB TeleRadyo) rebranded to Sibya TV, serving as Cebu's dedicated news and information TV channel, thus became the fourth Cebuano-language news channel and fifth overall to broadcast on the same language.
 September 9 - GMA Network implemented a layoff program covering GMA News TV due to COVID-19 pandemic. In addition to this, it was reported that GMA also announced the cancellation of productions on some programs airing on the said news channel with eleven shows were reportedly threatened to disappear off the air.
 September 10 - National Telecommunications Commission issued an order to recall all radio frequencies and channels assigned to ABS-CBN Corporation following the lack of congressional franchise.
 September 11–12
 September 11 - Following the successful launch of Kapamilya Online Live, and the relaunches of KTX and TuTuBee, ABS-CBN Corporation extended its digital and online presence to the virtual world by launching an edutainment interactive portal hub with featured some programming contents for kids exclusively on their social networking and website platforms, Just Love Kids.
 September 12 - The following day, ABS-CBN also launched a weekend morning programming block of the same name featuring with the same program contents for children exclusively on Kapamilya Channel.
 September 20 - GMA Network, in partnership with Jungo TV, formally launched its brand new Asian pop culture channel through K-pop, lifestyle and entertainment programming contents on digital terrestrial television, Hallypop (which is the Philippine version of a global TV network of the same name).
 September 21 - GMA News TV resumed its regular schedule slots with returning and new programming line-ups.
 September 22
 In acted on a 2013 illegal dismissal case, Supreme Court has ordered GMA Network to reinstate 30 cameramen and assistant cameramen and pay their backwages, allowances and other benefits from its illegal dismissal in 2013 up to actual reinstatement.
 POPTV made its official launched after being for soft operations in 2019.
 September 24 - Eugenio Lopez III tendered his resignation as Chairman Emeritus and Director of ABS-CBN Corporation and other Lopez-owned companies for personal reasons.
 September 28 - FPJ's Ang Probinsyano celebrated its 5th anniversary on Philippine television.

October
 October 2 - Saksi, GMA Network's longest running late-night newscast since 2002 and formerly as an early evening newscast during its first years, celebrated its 25th anniversary on Philippine television.
 October 5
 After many years of being a Sky Cable only channels, three ABS-CBN-owned cable channels: Cine Mo!, Jeepney TV and Metro Channel, were broadcast on G Sat.
 DepEd TV, an educational programming service block, expanded into a television network as the service was broadcast on other partnered providers including Cignal and SatLite.
 October 6 - ABS-CBN Corporation and Jesus Is Lord Church Worldwide (ZOE Broadcasting Network) entered a blocktime deal to air selected ABS-CBN shows and movies via Channel 11 (ZOE's owned TV frequency) in Mega Manila beginning on October 10. The following day, ABS-CBN also released another statement for the list of some programs that would include on Channel 11's line-up, respectively.
 October 8 - O Shopping made some changes on its channel space assignment from Channel 11 to Channel 25 (Metro Manila) and Channel 21 (Provincial) on Sky Cable, as ZOE's upcoming channel was assigned to Channel 11 beginning on the same day.
 October 9–11 - Due to the success of the Easter Triduum broadcast of the 190th General Conference of the Church of Jesus Christ of Latter-Day Saints, The Church of Jesus Christ of Latter-day Saints in the Philippines and GMA Network, through GMA News TV, broadcast the Church's 190th Semiannual General Conference via satellite delay on GMA News TV though both free-to-air (analog and digital) and cable TV (including Music and the Spoken Word, which aired on October 10). The broadcast, which aired remotely from Salt Lake City due to the COVID-19 pandemic that forced the first General Conference TV broadcast in the country earlier that year, marked the first time the Semiannual General Conference was broadcast on Philippine television.
 October 10 - ZOE TV rebranded to A2Z, which featured some contents of programs from its selected blocktimers (ABS-CBN and Knowledge Channel), licensors and providers (CBN Asia, Trinity Broadcasting Network and others), and ZOE's owned Light TV on the said network, after ABS-CBN and ZOE agreed with the entering of blocktime deal on October 6. This also marked the partial return of ABS-CBN programming on free TV after the cease-and-desist order by National Telecommunications Commission due to expired legislative franchise on May 5 and the denial of its renewed legislative franchise on July 10.
 October 20 - Bubble Gang celebrated its 25th anniversary on Philippine television.
 October 23 - MediaQuest Holdings, through Cignal TV and TV5 Network, Inc. with its sister company Smart Communications, announced a 5-and-a-half year deal with the University Athletic Association of the Philippines to aired the games beginning with the 83rd season on both free-to-air networks TV5 and One Sports, and on the cable and satellite channel One Sports+. Meanwhile, Smart postpaid and prepaid subscribers can avail the live streaming through its service platform. This marked the first time that the Philippine collegiate league games broadcast on TV5 since NCAA Philippines in 2013-15 and also marked the end of its 20-year relationship with ABS-CBN Corporation following the non-renewal of its congressional franchise on July 10 and the dissolution of ABS-CBN Sports division to close its business operations on August 31 during the COVID-19 pandemic in the Philippines.
 October 30 - After almost 2 years of broadcasting, Liga has ceased its broadcast on pay TV by Creative Programs, Inc. (a subsidiary of ABS-CBN Corporation) due to the non-renewal of its congressional franchise on July 10 and the dissolution of ABS-CBN Sports division to close its business operations on August 31 during the COVID-19 pandemic in the Philippines.

November
 November 1
 After 7 years of broadcasting, O Shopping has ceased its operations as a pay TV channel and infomercial program by ACJ O Shopping Corporation (a joint venture between ABS-CBN Corporation and CJ ENM O Shopping Division) due to the implementation of a retrenchment program covering its business company from August 7, following the non-renewal of its congressional franchise on July 10 and CJ Group's decision to close its business operations in Southeast Asia effective December 31 amid the COVID-19 pandemic.
 Cine Mo! has officially part of both Cignal and SatLite channel lineups of Cignal TV, following its successful launch of G Sat's channel lineup a month before.
 November 2 - TAP W rebranded to TAP TV as a general entertainment channel.
 November 4 - TAP TV broadcast its first news coverage of the 2020 United States presidential election, straight from the United States through NBC News.
 November 11 - Balitanghali, one of the nine surviving shows of GMA News TV since its 2011 launch and one of the last three shows inherited from its predecessor network Q, celebrated its 15th anniversary on Philippine television.
 November 12 - The National Telecommunications Commission approved the digital broadcast of A2Z on UHF Channel 20 and became available on most digital boxes, including ABS-CBN TV Plus and GMA Affordabox across Mega Manila.
 November 13
 iWantTFC officially made its grand launched after two months and 13 days of being in soft launch and the merging of iWant and TFC Online on September 1. The platform was made the strategy in three different tiers that has used similar to the US-based streaming service, Peacock: the free tier, the premium tier (which was available for paid subscribers and through subscribing it from telco companies) and an ad-free option with the movie rental service included for an additional cost.
 Ang Pinaka, one of the nine surviving shows of GMA News TV since its 2011 launch and one of the last three shows inherited from its predecessor network Q, celebrated its 15th anniversary on Philippine television.
 November 15 - TAP Edge reformatted as a drama-centric entertainment channel, ending its action sports programming via EDGEsport in December 2020.
 November 20
 Myx celebrated its 20th anniversary of broadcasting originated as a programming block of Studio 23.
 GMA Network announced a 5-year deal with the National Collegiate Athletic Association to cover the games of the NCAA from seasons 96 to 101. The new broadcast deal outbided TV5/One Sports (the league's former broadcaster in seasons 89 and 90) with the revenues on GMA's new deal would be donated in support of the financial aid for the students of the league's participating colleges and it would broadcast on GMA News TV and on the network's official website; thus ending its second stint with ABS-CBN Corporation (which began on the 91st season) following the non-renewal of its congressional franchise on July 10 and the dissolution of ABS-CBN Sports division to close its business operations on August 31 during the COVID-19 pandemic in the Philippines. It also marked the return of sporting events for the network for the first time since 2018 and for the sister network since 2016 after the cancelation of News TV All Sports.
 November 26 - For the first time, TAP TV became the exclusive Philippine broadcaster for the premiere live aired on cable and satellite television broadcast of Macy's Thanksgiving Day Parade via NBC from Macy's flagship store in New York City, USA since 2013 with the last year's parade was broadcast via tape delay on CNN Philippines.

December
 December 1 - Kapwa Ko Mahal Ko celebrated its 45th anniversary on Philippine television.
 December 8 - GMA Network, Inc. launched "Synergy: A GMA Collaboration", a company's division composed of a group that catered and produced ticketing and non-ticketing events and activities.
 December 11 - After almost two months of the announce broadcast deal with Cignal TV, the University Athletic Association of the Philippines announced the cancellation of its 83rd season, which supposed to schedule its first airing in 2021 on One Sports, due to the health safety of student-athletes amid the COVID-19 pandemic in the Philippines.
 December 15 - Viva Entertainment launched an over-the-top content platform, VivaMax, and began its soft operations which include movies and TV series content from the Viva library, as well as Tagalized versions of Hollywood and Korean movies, in addition to its exclusive-owned web series and miniseries.
 December 20 - Jessica Villarubin of Cebu won the third season of The Clash.
 December 21 - Philippine Collective Media Corporation, a Tacloban-based broadcast media company owned by Leyte 1st District Representative and House Majority Floor Leader Martin Romualdez, granted an amendment of its congressional franchise under Republic Act No. 11508 (which previously Republic Act No. 9773, where originally limited to Eastern Visayas only), allowing PCMC to operate radio and television stations nationwide. The company operated a local independent station PRTV in Tacloban.
 December 26 - Singer-songwriter Daryl Ong (portrayed as "2-2-B") was proclaimed the grand winner of the first season of Masked Singer Pilipinas.
 December 31 - DZIQ and its television counterpart Inquirer 990 Television has ceased its broadcasting operations by the Inquirer Group of Companies due to programming redundancies, lack of advertising support and cost-cutting measures as well as change in business directions during the COVID-19 pandemic in the Philippines.

Unknown (dates)
 September - Regional News Group was formed as a new independent cooperative multicasting media group made by the several retrenched employees, news anchors and reporters of the now-defunct ABS-CBN Regional and it composed of different versions nationwide including RNG Luzon (based in Baguio), RNG Bicol (based in Legazpi and Naga) and RNG Mindanao (based in Davao and Cagayan de Oro).

Debuts

Major networks

ABS-CBN

The following are programs that debuted on ABS-CBN:

Re-runs
 January 5: MathDali
 March 16: 100 Days to Heaven, May Bukas Pa and On the Wings of Love
 March 21: Your Face Sounds Familiar Kids (season 1)
 March 23: Got to Believe, The Legal Wife, Walang Hanggan and Wildflower
 March 28: Bayani, Hiraya Manawari and Sine'skwela
 March 29: Pilipinas Got Talent (season 6)
 April 13: Tubig at Langis
 May 4: Meteor Garden (2018)

A2Z

The following are programs that debuted on A2Z:

Re-runs
 October 10: Kidz Weekend
 October 10: ATBP: Awit, Titik at Bilang na Pambata (School at Home), Bayani (School at Home), Matanglawin (School at Home) and Team Yey!
 October 12: Kidz Toon Time
 October 12: Cedie, Ang Munting Prinsipe, The Flying House, Princess Sarah and Superbook Reimagined
 December 10: The Adventures of Tom Sawyer
 December 14: Dog of Flanders
 October 12: School at Home
 October 12: Alikabuk, Epol/Apple, Math-Tinik, Pamana, Sine'skwela and Solved
 October 13: Hiraya Manawari
 October 14: Karen's World, Kasaysayan TV and Salam
 October 15: MathDali
 October 16: Gab to Go
 October 26: Wow!
 November 9: Why?
 November 10: K-High
 November 12: Estudyantipid
 November 19: Agos
 December 1: Pahina
 December 4: Carlo's Blog and Puno ng Buhay
 December 17: Tipong Pinoy
 October 26: The Good Son

Notes
^  Originally aired on ABS-CBN
^  Originally aired on GMA
^  Originally aired on Yey!
^  Originally aired on Jeepney TV
^  Originally aired on Kapamilya Channel
^  Originally aired on NBN (now PTV)
^  Originally aired on Knowledge Channel
^  Originally aired on Q (now GMA News TV)

GMA

The following are programs that debuted on GMA Network:

Re-runs

TV5

The following are programs that debuted on TV5:

Unknown (dates)
 November: Frontline Eastern Visayas (TV5 Leyte)

Re-runs

Notes
^  Originally aired on ABS-CBN
^  Originally aired on Colours
^  Originally aired on Sari-Sari Channel
^  Originally aired on GMA Network
^  Originally aired on RPN (now CNN Philippines)
^  Originally aired on One Screen

State-owned networks

PTV

The following are programs that debuted on People's Television Network:
 March 16: Public Briefing: #LagingHandaPH
 April 20: Tutok Tulfo 2.0 (hook-up via Radyo Pilipinas 1 738 AM)
 May 1: Counterpoint with Secretary Salvador Panelo
 July 27: PTV Balita Ngayon
 August 3: Network Briefing News
 September 7: PTV News Tonight, Rise and Shine Pilipinas and Ulat Bayan (weekday edition)
 October 5: Tutok PDEA, Kontra Droga (hook-up via Radyo Pilipinas 1 738 AM)
 November 21: Barangay 4

IBC

The following are programs that debuted on IBC:
 January 5: Misa Tradionalis Latin Mass and Cathechism
 March 23: Public Briefing: #LagingHandaPH and Sentro Balita (simulcast via People's Television Network)
 May 1: PTV News (simulcast via People's Television Network)
 August 2: FYI
 August 11: DepEd TV

Minor networks
The following are programs that debuted on minor networks:

Unknown (dates)
 Ani at Kita sa TV, Chinatown TV and DepEd TV on BEAM TV

Other channels
The following are programs that debuted on other channels:

Re-runs

Notes
^  Originally aired on ABS-CBN
^  Originally aired on GMA
^  Originally aired on TV5
^  Originally aired on Cine Mo!
^  Originally aired on Yey!
^  Originally aired on S+A
^  Originally aired on GMA News TV
^  Originally aired on Jeepney TV
^  Originally aired on Sari-Sari Channel
^  Originally aired on Hero (now defunct)
^  Originally aired on ETC
^  Originally aired on Jack TV (now defunct)
^  Originally aired on 2nd Avenue (now defunct)
^  Originally aired on CT (now defunct)
^  Originally aired on Studio 23 (now S+A)
^  Originally aired on Q (now GMA News TV)
^  Originally aired on RPN (now CNN Philippines)
^  Originally aired on Fox Filipino (now defunct)
^  Originally aired on Kapamilya Channel
^  Originally aired on Metro Channel
^  Originally aired on Asianovela Channel
^  Originally aired on NBN (now PTV)
^  Originally aired on Knowledge Channel

Video streaming services
The following are programs that debuted on video streaming services:

Returning or renamed programs

Major networks

Other channels

Video streaming services

Programs transferring networks

Major networks

Other channels

Video streaming services

Finales

Major networks

ABS-CBN

The following are programs that ended on ABS-CBN:

Stopped airing

COVID-19 pandemic

ABS-CBN franchise renewal controversy

Cancelled
 March 13: Make It with You and Pamilya Ko (reason: Permanent cancellation of tapings due to the COVID-19 pandemic in the Philippines and shutdown of ABS-CBN. Both shows were not included in the lineup of the ABS-CBN shows that suppose to aired on the newly launched Kapamilya Channel.)
 March 17: Bandila (reason: Program replaced by the replay of TV Patrol due to the COVID-19 pandemic in the Philippines and The World Tonight on Kapamilya Channel due to ABS-CBN franchise renewal controversy.)
 March 25: TV Patrol North Luzon (ABS-CBN Pampanga) (reason: Temporary suspension of telecast due to the COVID-19 pandemic in the Philippines and ABS-CBN franchise renewal controversy which led to end operations of TV Patrol regional shows)
 May 5: Umagang Kay Ganda (reason: Program silently cancelled due to the shutdown of ABS-CBN. Resumed as Umagang Kuwentuhan via their Facebook page beginning May 28.)

A2Z

The following are programs that ended on A2Z:
 October 23: Zinema Presents (A2Z Zinema)
 November 29: Sunday Zine Hits (A2Z Zinema)
 December 9: Princess Sarah (Kidz Toon Time)
 December 11: Cedie, Ang Munting Prinsipe (Kidz Toon Time)

Unknown (dates)
 November: A2Z News Alert

GMA

The following are programs that ended on GMA Network:

Stopped airing

Miscellaneous

COVID-19 pandemic

Cancelled
 April 4: Ilaban Natin Yan! (reason: Permanent cancellation of tapings due to the COVID-19 pandemic in the Philippines. Program replaced by the returning Wish Ko Lang! on July 11.)

TV5

The following are programs that ended on TV5:

Stopped airing

Miscellaneous

COVID-19 pandemic

Cancelled
 August 9: Healing Galing sa TV (reason: Program replaced by Fit for Life and moved to UNTV on December 5 as Healing Galing Live!.)
 September 9: Love Life with Kris (reason: Unknown. Show was not yet debut on the said network.)

State-owned networks

PTV

The following are programs that ended on People's Television Network:
 January 4: Lutong-Luto with CJ Hirro
 March 18: PTV Newsbreak
 July 31: Bagong Pilipinas, Daily Info and PTV News Headlines
 September 4: PTV News

Stopped airing

Miscellaneous

COVID-19 pandemic

IBC

The following are programs that ended on IBC:
 January 11: ATC E-Sports Highlights
 January 29: Arnelli in da Haus
 March 1: Misa Tradionalis Latin Mass and Catechism
 May 15: PTV News (simulcast via People's Television Network)
 June 14: El Shaddai
 July 31: Sentro Balita (simulcast via People's Television Network)
 October 3: Public Briefing: #LagingHandaPH

Stopped airing

Miscellaneous

COVID-19 pandemic

Minor networks
 March 13: Make My Day with Larry Henares and Pondahan ni Kuya Daniel on UNTV
 September 11: Agila Balita on Net 25

Other channels

Stopped airing

Miscellaneous

COVID-19 pandemic

ABS-CBN franchise renewal controversy

Cancelled
 March 9: UAAP Season 82 on S+A (reason: The University Athletic Association of the Philippines announced the cancellation of its season on April 7 due to COVID-19 pandemic in the Philippines.)
 March 10: 2020 Philippine Super Liga Grand Prix Conference on One Sports and One Sports+ (reason: The Philippine Super Liga announced the cancellation of its season due to COVID-19 pandemic in the Philippines.)
 March 11: 2020 PBA D-League Aspirants' Cup on One Sports and PBA Rush (reason: The Philippine Basketball Association announced the cancellation of its current season as well as the dissolution of the said developmental league on October 12 due to COVID-19 pandemic in the Philippines.)
 March 13: Kay Susan Tayo! sa Super Radyo DZBB (Dobol B sa News TV) on GMA News TV (reason: Program announced its cancellation due to the COVID-19 pandemic in the Philippines and replaced by Bantay COVID-19 coverage on March 16–18 and Public Briefing: #LagingHandaPH beginning March 23 on Dobol B sa News TV block.) 
 August 10: Burado on Kapamilya Channel (reason: Program announced its cancellation due to COVID-19 pandemic in the Philippines and overseas. Show was not yet debut on the said network. Program renamed to and premiered as Walang Hanggang Paalam on September 28 via Kapamilya Channel and October 12 via A2Z.)
 September 18: Kahit Minsan Lang on Kapamilya Channel (reason: Program announced its cancellation due to the lockdowns caused by the COVID-19 pandemic in the Philippines. Show was not yet debut on the said network. Program renamed to and premiered as A Family Affair on June 27, 2022 via Kapamilya Channel, A2Z and TV5.)
 September 30: Cara y Cruz on Kapamilya Channel (reason: Program announced its cancellation due to Julia Barretto's departure from Star Magic and joined Viva Artist Agency. Show was not yet debut on the said network. Program renamed to and premiered as Bagong Umaga on October 26 via Kapamilya Channel and A2Z.)
 October 1: Ang Lihim ni Ligaya on Kapamilya Channel (reason: Program announced its cancellation due to Ivana Alawi's backing out from the production amid the COVID-19 pandemic in the Philippines. Show was not yet debut on the said network. Program renamed to and premiered as La Vida Lena on November 14 (as a pilot series) via iWantTFC and on June 28, 2021 (as a full series) via Kapamilya Channel, A2Z and TV5.)

Unknown (dates)
 Business Nightly, Early Edition, Future Perfect, Gametime, Green Living, On The Money, Square Off and Talkback on ABS-CBN News Channel (reason: Programs announced its cancellation due to the COVID-19 pandemic in the Philippines and the ABS-CBN franchise renewal controversy.)

Video streaming services
 August 19: Hello Stranger on YouTube (Black Sheep)
 September 20: Gameboys (season 1) on YouTube (The IdeaFirst Company)
 November 20: Gaya Sa Pelikula on YouTube (Globe Studios)
 November 26: Ben X Jim (season 1) on YouTube (Regal Entertainment)
 November 29: Boys' Lockdown on YouTube (Ticket2Me)
 December 5: Coke Studio: Peel Mo, Panalo Promo on YouTube (Coke Studio Philippines)
 December 10: Oh, Mando! on iWantTFC
 December 19: Bawal Lumabas: The Series on iWantTFC

Networks
The following are a list of free-to-air and cable channels or networks launches and closures in 2020.

Launches

Stations changing network affiliation
The following is a list of television stations that have made or will make noteworthy affiliation switches in 2020.

Rebranded
The following is a list of television stations or cable channels that have made or will make noteworthy network rebrands in 2020.

Closures

Stopped broadcasting
The following is a list of stations and channels or networks that have stopped broadcasting or (temporarily) off the air in 2020.

Miscellaneous

COVID-19 pandemic

ABS-CBN franchise renewal controversy

Cancelled
The following is a list of television stations or cable channels that have the network cancellation in 2020.

Planned rebrand

Notes
 : via Cignal TV providers since October 21
 : via G Sat until and since July (both old and new)
 : via Sky Cable since December 14
 : via GMA Affordabox since December 12
 : via DTT since November 12
 : On June 30, Sky Direct suspend its operations due to the ABS-CBN franchise renewal controversy
 : On May 5, O Shopping ceased its broadcast due to the ABS-CBN franchise renewal controversy
 : via Sky Cable until October 7 (old); October 8−31 (new)

Services
The following are a list of television operators or providers and streaming media platforms or services launches and closures in 2020.

Launches

Rebranded
The following is a list of streaming providers that have made or will make noteworthy service rebrands in 2020.

Closures

Stopped operating
The following is a list of providers and platforms or services that have stopped operating or streaming in 2020.

Miscellaneous

ABS-CBN franchise renewal controversy

Deaths
January
 January 14 – Twink Macaraig, (b. 1964), news anchor.

March
 March 26 – Menggie Cobarrubias, (b. 1951), actor.
 March 30 – Rolando Valdueza, (b. 1960), Chief Financial Officer of ABS-CBN Corporation.

April
 April 9 – Leila Benitez-McCollum, (b. 1930), former TV and radio personality.

May
 May 4 – Babajie, (b. 1984), comedian.
 May 10 – Sonny Parsons, (b. 1958), actor and singer.

June
 June 10 – Anita Linda, (b. 1924), veteran film and TV actress.

July
 July 13 – Kim Idol, (b. 1979), comedian.

August
 August 4 – Eddie Ilarde, (b. 1934), former TV and radio host.
 August 8 – Alfredo Lim, (b. 1929), former TV and radio host.
 August 10 – Neil Ocampo, (b. 1958), veteran radio anchorman and news reporter.

October
 October 10 – Rev. Fr. Sonny Ramirez, OP, (b. 1945), spiritual adviser and former host of Sharing in the City.
 October 24 – Al Quinn, (b. 1933), veteran TV director.

November
 November 20 – Ricky Velasco, (b. 1959), former ABS-CBN News and DZMM reporter.
 November 29 – April Boy Regino, (b. 1961), musician and actor.

See also
2020 in television

References

 
Television in the Philippines by year
Philippine television-related lists